The 1900–01 Connecticut Aggies men's basketball team represented Connecticut Agricultural College, now the University of Connecticut, in the 1900–01 collegiate men's basketball season. This was the first year that the school had a basketball team. The Aggies completed the season with a 1–0 record against a local high school.

Schedule 

|-
!colspan=12 style=""| Regular Season

Schedule Source:

References 

UConn Huskies men's basketball seasons
Connecticut
1901 in sports in Connecticut
1900 in sports in Connecticut